Braíma Injai (born 6 October 1975), known as Braíma, is a Guinea Bissauan retired footballer. Mainly a defensive midfielder, he also held Portuguese nationality due to the years spent playing in that country.

Club career
Born in Bissau, Injai played most of his career in Portugal, mainly for modest clubs, but had a four-year Primeira Liga spell with Gil Vicente FC, being used with regularity. His worst output consisted of 22 matches in the 2002–03 season, in which he started in 18 of those appearances as the Barcelos team finished in eighth position.

In July 2007, after a brief spell in the Portuguese second division with Portimonense SC, Braíma left for Cyprus's Olympiakos Nicosia. In early 2009, he returned to Africa, joining Angolan side Estrela Clube Primeiro de Maio, but went back to Portugal shortly after and resumed his career in amateur football.

International career
Braíma was a stalwart for the Guinea-Bissau national team for well over a decade, appearing in many FIFA World Cup qualification series.

External links

1975 births
Living people
Sportspeople from Bissau
Bissau-Guinean footballers
Bissau-Guinean emigrants to Portugal
Portuguese footballers
Association football midfielders
Primeira Liga players
Liga Portugal 2 players
Segunda Divisão players
Gondomar S.C. players
C.F. União de Lamas players
Estrela Clube Primeiro de Maio players
Boavista F.C. players
C.D. Aves players
Leça F.C. players
Gil Vicente F.C. players
Portimonense S.C. players
SC Vianense players
Cypriot First Division players
Olympiakos Nicosia players
Guinea-Bissau international footballers
Bissau-Guinean expatriate footballers
Expatriate footballers in Cyprus
Expatriate footballers in Angola
Bissau-Guinean expatriate sportspeople in Cyprus